Untold: Operation Flagrant Foul is a 2022 American Netflix original documentary film directed by David Terry Fine.  The film was released on August 30, 2022.

Summary 
The film is the eighth installment in the nine-part Untold documentary film series. Its story is centered around NBA referee Tim Donaghy, who was caught in the 2007 NBA betting scandal where he was gambling on his own games.

References

External links 
 
 
 Official trailer

2022 films
2022 documentary films
American sports documentary films
2020s English-language films
2020s American films
Netflix original documentary films